Live X refers to concerts hosted by the Atlanta, Georgia-based radio station 99X, generally performed in an unplugged, acoustic style. Each year, a CD was released by 99X containing select tracks from many Live X concerts that occurred in the past year. All proceeds from the sales benefit the I Am 99X Foundation. The final edition, Live X 12, was released in 2007.

Live X for Humanity 

This album benefited Habitat for Humanity.
 "Believe" by Lenny Kravitz
 "Mmm Mmm Mmm Mmm" by Crash Test Dummies
 "Low" by Cracker
 "Down By the River" by Indigo Girls
 "It's a Shame About Ray" by Evan Dando
 "Idaho" by Bodeans
 "Divine Intervention" by Matthew Sweet
 "Waiting for the Sun" by Jayhawks
 "Creep" by Radiohead
 "Felt So Cool" by Adam Schmitt
 "Superman's Song" by Crash Test Dummies

Live X II – One Life 

 "Steppin' Out With My Baby" by Tony Bennett
 "All I Wanna Do" by Sheryl Crow
 "One" by Automatic Baby
 "Laid" by James
 "Zombie" by The Cranberries
 "Fall Down" by Toad the Wet Sprocket
 "Crucify" by Tori Amos
 "Locked Out" by Crowded House
 "Kim the Waitress" by Material Issue
 "Good Enough" by Sarah McLachlan
 "Operation Spirit" by Live
 "I Need Love" by Sam Phillips
 "Am I Wrong" by Love Spit Love
 "I Left My Heart in San Francisco" by Tony Bennett

Live X III – RAINN Songs 
 "Silent All These Years" by Tori Amos
 "Name" by Goo Goo Dolls
 "Satellite" by Dave Matthews Band
 "I Want to Come Over" by Melissa Etheridge
 "Desperately Wanting" by Better Than Ezra
 "Ladder" by Joan Osborne
 "Love Untold" by Paul Westerberg
 "Fast Car" by Tracy Chapman
 "Flood" by Jars of Clay
 "Counting Blue Cars" by Dishwalla
 "You Were Meant for Me" by Jewel
 "Comedown" by Bush
 "The Old Apartment" by Barenaked Ladies
 "Love Songs" by Fleming and John

Live X IV – Home 

 "Sunny Came Home" by Shawn Colvin
 "Open Up Your Eyes" by Tonic
 "Push" by Matchbox Twenty
 "Sex and Candy" by Marcy Playground
 "Song 2" by Blur
 "Not an Addict" by K's Choice
 "Try" by Michael Penn
 "Shame on You" by Indigo Girls
 "Dead Man Walking" by David Bowie
 "Three Marlenas" by The Wallflowers
 "Hell" by Squirrel Nut Zippers
 "Frank Sinatra" by Cake
 "Criminal" by Fiona Apple
 "Long, Long Time" by Love Spit Love
 "How's It Going to Be" by Third Eye Blind
 "Is It Like Today" by World Party
 "Home" by Sheryl Crow

Live X V – Shimmer and Shine

Disk I – Shimmer 
 "Lullaby" by Shawn Mullins
 "Unsent" by Alanis Morissette
 "Airport Song" by Guster
 "She Talks to Angels" by The Black Crowes
 "Prophecy" by Remy Zero
 "I Am the Bullgod" by Kid Rock
 "Freak of the Weak" by Marvelous 3
 "All for You" by Sister Hazel
 "Don't Change Your Plans" by Ben Folds Five
 "Cathedrals" by Jump, Little Children
 "The Way" by Fastball
 "Inside Out" by Eve 6
 "Shimmer" by Fuel

Disk II – Shine 
 "Shimmer" by Shawn Mullins
 "Can't Not" by Alanis Morissette
 "Demons" by Guster
 "Remedy" by The Black Crowes
 "Gramarye" by Remy Zero
 "Cowboy" by Kid Rock
 "Let Me Go" by Marvelous 3
 "Wanted It to Be" by Sister Hazel
 "Magic" by Ben Folds Five
 "B-13" by Jump, Little Children
 "Sooner or Later" by Fastball
 "Open Road Song" by Eve 6
 "Bittersweet" by Fuel

Live X 6 – Walk Unafraid 

This album benefited the Georgia Litigation Fund and the Georgia Equality Project.
 "Walk Unafraid" by R.E.M.
 "Everything You Want" by Vertical Horizon
 "Is Anybody Home?" by Our Lady Peace
 "Spaceship" by Angie Aparo
 "My Hero" by Foo Fighters
 "If You Could Only See" by Tonic
 "Can't Change Me" by Chris Cornell
 "Meet Virginia" by Train
 "Age of Innocence" by Billy Corgan
 "Yeah, Whatever" by Splender
 "Heavy" by Collective Soul
 "Atlanta" by Stone Temple Pilots

Live X 7 – Black and White World

 "The Beauty of Gray" by Live
 "Hanging by a Moment" by Lifehouse
 "Leaving Town" by Dexter Freebish
 "Drive" by Incubus
 "The Middle" by Jimmy Eat World
 "Life on a Chain" by Pete Yorn
 "Babylon" by David Gray
 "The Space Between" by Dave Matthews
 "Camera One" by Josh Joplin Group
 "Letters" by Stroke 9
 "Drops of Jupiter (Tell Me)" by Train
 "Tribute" by Tenacious D

Live X 8 – Hidden 

 "Yellow" by Coldplay
 "Running Away" by Hoobastank
 "Losing My Religion" by R.E.M.
 "Flake" by Jack Johnson
 "Sober" by Butch Walker
 "Comfort Eagle" by Cake
 "Save Me" by Remy Zero
 "Fine Again" by Seether
 "Capricorn" by Thirty Seconds to Mars
 "Control" by Puddle of Mudd
 "The Scientist" by Coldplay (Hidden Track)
 "Crawling in the Dark" by Hoobastank (Hidden Track)
 "All the Way to Reno (You're Gonna Be a Star)" by R.E.M. (Hidden Track)

Live X 9 – Joyride 

 "Taking Off" by The Cure
 "Silver and Cold" by AFI
 "No One Knows" by Queens of the Stone Age
 "Between Love and Hate" by The Strokes
 "Message in a Bottle" by Incubus
 "Heel Over Head" by Puddle of Mudd
 "What's Your Number?" by Cypress Hill
 "Mixtape" by Butch Walker
 "Just Like You" by Three Days Grace
 "Followed the Waves" by Melissa Auf der Maur
 "Meant to Live" by Switchfoot

Live X 10 – Recently and Relived

Disk I – Recently 
 "Right Right Now Now" by Beastie Boys
 "Only Happy When It Rains" by Garbage
 "Run" by Snow Patrol
 "Work" by Jimmy Eat World
 "Gone For Good" by The Shins
 "L.S.F." by Kasabian
 "Somewhere Only We Know" by Keane
 "The Bucket" by Kings of Leon
 "Beautiful" by Moby
 "Burn the Good Ones Down" by Red Letter Agent

Disk II – Relived 
 "Recently" by Dave Matthews Band
 "Jaime" by Weezer
 "My Hero" by Foo Fighters
 "Walk Unafraid" by R.E.M.
 "Song 2" by Blur
 "Lullaby" by Shawn Mullins
 "Yellow" by Coldplay
 "Is Anybody Home?" by Our Lady Peace
 "Waiting for the Sun" by The Jayhawks
 "Comedown" by Bush
 "Shame on You" by Indigo Girls
 "Frank Sinatra" by Cake
 "Don't Change Your Plans" by Ben Folds Five
 "Criminal" by Fiona Apple
 "Between Love and Hate" by The Strokes
 "Drive" by Incubus

Live X 11 – Strange Apparition 

 "Nausea (The Chap Remix)" by Beck
 "King Without a Crown" by Matisyahu
 "Woman" by Wolfmother
 "Soul Meets Body" by Death Cab for Cutie
 "MakeDamnSure" by Taking Back Sunday
 "Tear You Apart" by She Wants Revenge
 "Brighter Than Sunshine" by Aqualung
 "Angels Losing Sleep" by Our Lady Peace
 "Save Me" by Shinedown
 "Rooftops (A Liberation Broadcast)" by Lostprophets
 "Razorblade" by Blue October
 "Paralyzed" by Rock Kills Kid
 "Riot Van" by Arctic Monkeys

Live X 12 – Souls 

 "Bus Ride" by Rocco Deluca
 "Phantom Limb" by The Shins
 "From Yesterday" by Thirty Seconds to Mars
 "Well Thought Out Twinkles" by Silversun Pickups
 "I'm Designer" by Queens of the Stone Age
 "The Moneymaker" by Rilo Kiley
 "101" by Albert Hammond Jr.
 "Believe" by The Bravery
 "What If I Knew" by Dinosaur Jr.
 "When Your Heart Stops Beating" by +44
 "Say This Sooner" by The Almost
 "One Man Revolution" by The Nightwatchman
 "All the Same" by Sick Puppies
 "Hey There Delilah" by Plain White T's
 "Ultra Payloaded Satellite Party" by Perry Farrell's Satellite Party

Charity albums
Radio station compilation album series
Live album series
Compilation album series
1990s live albums
2000s compilation albums
2000s live albums
1990s compilation albums
1993 live albums
1993 compilation albums
1994 live albums
1995 live albums
1996 live albums
1997 live albums
1998 live albums
2000 live albums
2001 live albums
2002 live albums
2003 live albums
2004 live albums
2005 live albums
2006 live albums
2007 live albums
1994 compilation albums
1995 compilation albums
1996 compilation albums
1997 compilation albums
1998 compilation albums
2000 compilation albums
2001 compilation albums
2002 compilation albums
2003 compilation albums
2004 compilation albums
2005 compilation albums
2006 compilation albums
2007 compilation albums
Alternative rock compilation albums
Live alternative rock albums